List of Republic of Ireland national futsal team matches.

1983

2001

2002

2008

2009

2010

2011

Notes

References

nmatches
Ireland
1983–84 in Republic of Ireland association football
2000–01 in Republic of Ireland association football
2001–02 in Republic of Ireland association football
2002–03 in Republic of Ireland association football
2008 in Republic of Ireland association football
2009 in Republic of Ireland association football
2010 in Republic of Ireland association football
2011 in Republic of Ireland association football
Ireland
Ireland
Ireland
Ireland
Ireland
Ireland